Miss Indonesia 2013 was the ninth edition of the Miss Indonesia beauty pageant, held on February 20, 2013 at Jakarta International Expo, Jakarta. The winner of Miss Indonesia 2013 will represent Indonesia in Miss World 2013 in Jakarta, Indonesia. The current titleholder of Miss World, Wenxia Yu attended the awarding night, when Ines Putri of Bali crowned her successor.

Judges 
 Liliana Tanaja Tanoesoedibjo
 Martha Tilaar
 Harry Darsono
 Ferry Salim
 Noor Sabah Nael Traavik

Results

Placements

Fast Track Winners
Fast track events held during preliminary round and the winners of Fast Track events are automatically qualified to enter the semifinal round. This year's fast track events include: Talent, Sport, Modelling, and Beauty With A Purpose.

 West Kalimantan - Vania Larissa (Talent)
 Bengkulu - Nadira Titalia (Beauty With A Purpose)
 Yogyakarta Special Region - Janice Jessica Hermijanto (Sport)
 East Java - Regina Celine (Modelling)

Special Awards

Order of announcements

Top 10

West Kalimantan
Bengkulu
Yogyakarta Special Region
East Java
West Java
Southeast Sulawesi
South Sulawesi
Central Java
North Sumatera
Maluku

Top 5

West Kalimantan
North Sumatera
West Java
Southeast Sulawesi
Central Java

Top 3

West Kalimantan
West Java
Central Java

Non-Winners

Contestants

Crossovers

Puteri Indonesia
2017 :  Jakarta SCR - Karina Nandia Saputri (unplaced)

Audition Schedule 
 Medan: September 30, 2012
 Bandung: October 6–7, 2012
 Makassar: October 14, 2012
 Surabaya: October 21, 2012
 Denpasar: November 4, 2012
 Jakarta: November 15–16, 2012

Audition Miss Indonesia 2013 Special Hunt 
Manado: October 16, 2012
Semarang and Yogyakarta: October 23–24, 2012

Audition Miss Indonesia 2013 Goes to Campus 
Universitas Trisakti 
London School of Public Relations
Universitas Tarumanegara
Universitas Atma Jaya: November 22, 2012

References

External links 
 Official site

2013 beauty pageants
Miss Indonesia